C106, C-106, or variation, may refer to:

 Xingu corydoras, C106, a species of South American "Corydoras" armoured catfish
 Caldwell 106 (C106), the designation for globular cluster of 47 Tucanae located in the constellation Tucana.
 C-106 Loadmaster, a prototype World War II twin-engined transport aircraft built by Cessna for the United States Army Air Forces
 CC-106 Yukon, the Royal Canadian Air Force designation for the Canadair CL-44
 Pahang State Route C106, Malaysia
 KWKZ (106.1 FM), "Coyote Country C-106", a Missouri, USA country music radio station
 CKVG-FM (106.5 FM), "C-106 Country", an Alberta, Canada country music radio station
 SpaceX Dragon C106, the first SpaceX Dragon space capsule to be reused